Archbishop Spalding High School is a private, Catholic co-educational high school located in Severn, Maryland, USA. It is located in the Roman Catholic Archdiocese of Baltimore. Most of its students live in Annapolis, Crownsville, Arnold, Pasadena, Severna Park, Crofton, Millersville, Glen Burnie, or Davidsonville in Anne Arundel County. Some also travel from southern Baltimore County, east Prince George's County and parts of Howard County. Spalding has numerous clubs for student involvement and/or academic competition, including Academic Bowl, Mock Trial, Strategic Gaming, HOPE (Help Our Planet Earth) and a NAIMUN award-winning Model United Nations team. It also has many competitive sports teams, such as rugby, soccer, cheerleading, dance, basketball, softball, american football, ice hockey, baseball, lacrosse, track and cross country. These athletic teams compete in the MIAA and the IAAM Conferences. The school sponsors a highly competitive music program, in which students participate in interstate competitions each year. Archbishop Spalding's mascot is the Cavalier.

Background
Archbishop Spalding was established in 1963 by as an all-girls high school called Holy Trinity High School. When the school moved to its present location in 1966, it was renamed Martin Spalding High School in honor of the seventh archbishop of Baltimore. Its name was changed to Archbishop Spalding High School in 1986. The school has been coeducational since 1973.

The addition of a new arts and technology wing was completed in September 2009.

Campus/facilities
The school's facilities include 50 academic classrooms and four science laboratories.  Its library maintains a collection of approximately 14,000 books and 24 desktop computers for student research.  An entire wing of the school is networked for wireless computing. The school also has an IMAC laboratory, two personal computer laboratories and a Project Lead the Way Engineering program.  All classrooms have access to video and computer projection equipment for visual presentations.  The auditorium, with 1,200 seats, provides a location for school wide assemblies, as well as theatre and music productions. A new auditorium was built in 2017, allowing for more space. A chapel is available for use by students, parents and faculty.

The school has seven athletic fields. Its athletic stadium has an all-weather turf field, eight-lane track, seating for 2,000 and a video scoreboard. The main gymnasium seats 1,100 and a secondary gymnasium seats 500.

An outdoor area known as the Senior Garden is traditionally reserved for use by senior students during their lunch breaks.

Sports 
Archbishop Spalding competes in the Maryland Interscholastic Athletic Association (MIAA) in boys' sports and in the Interscholastic Athletic Association of Maryland (IAAM) in girls' sports, against Baltimore-area schools. It plays in either the "A" or "B" divisions of these leagues.

Baltimore Sun Boys Metro Player of the Year Awards 
 Reb Beatty: boys' soccer 1997
 Rudy Gay: boys' basketball 2004

Cole Gallagher:2010 Washington Post All Met Team, 2010  Baltimore Sun All Met Team.
Charlie Lynch 2010 Washington Post All Met Team, 2010 Baltimore Sun All Met Team, 2011 National Prep Champion, 2011 Wrestler of The year Washington Post.
Tyler Blohm: 2016 Baltimore Sun All-Metro Player of the Year, Gatorade Maryland Baseball Player of the Year, Drafted by the Baltimore Orioles in the 17th round of the MLB draft.

Performance groups 
Archbishop Spalding has a number of performance groups, including instrumental and vocal ensembles. Instrumental groups include a guitar ensemble, string ensemble, jazz band, concert band, symphonic band and wind ensemble. Vocal groups include advanced women's chorus, girls' chorale, jazz harmony, chromosome Y and vocal ensemble. AP Music Theory is offered as an elective class in the curriculum. Stephanie Huesgen, band director, was selected as one of SBO's national list of "50 Directors Who Make a Difference" in 2005. In 2007 at the national Musicfest in Orlando, Florida, Archbishop Spalding was awarded "Grand Band Champion", and was thus the overall national winner for that week's competition.

Several instrumental and vocal scholarships are available to incoming students upon audition.

Notable alumni

 Zach Abey, United States Naval Academy quarterback
 Kyle Berkshire, Long drive champion
 Tamar Braxton, singer
 Kyle Dixon, professional lacrosse player
 Mike Flanagan, film director, writer, producer
 Rudy Gay, professional basketball player
 Jimi Haha, Jimmie's Chicken Shack's lead singer
 Nick Kuhl, professional rugby union player
 Amy Langville, basketball player and mathematician
 Chris Lucas, LoCash Cowboys, singer, songwriter, recording artist
 Christine Nairn, professional soccer player
 Cam Whitmore, basketball player
 Bernie Miklasz, American sportswriter and sports radio personality.

See also

National Catholic Educational Association

References

External links
Archbishop Spalding High School
SBO's "50 Directors Who Make a Difference"
Archbishop Spalding's Band Wins National Competition
Annapolis Review
Roman Catholic Archdiocese of Baltimore

Catholic secondary schools in Maryland
Schools in Anne Arundel County, Maryland
Educational institutions established in 1963
1963 establishments in Maryland
Severn, Maryland